Dmytro Matviyenko; Dmitriy Matviyenko (born 25 May 1992) is a Ukrainian (until 2014), Russian football defender currently playing for Crimean club Sevastopol.

Career
Matviyanko was born in Saky where at the age of 6 he started attending the local sportive youth school. Matviyenko made his debut for Tavriya Simferopol against Metalurh Zaporizhzhia on 9 March 2013 in the Ukrainian Premier League.

Personal life 
His younger brother Mykola Matviyenko is also a professional footballer and plays for Ukrainian Premier League club Shakhtar Donetsk and Ukraine national football team. In 2014, after the annexation of Saky to Russia he received Russian citizenship with the Russian name Dmitriy Matviyenko.

References

External links

1992 births
Living people
People from Saky
Ukrainian footballers
Ukrainian footballers banned from domestic competitions
Ukrainian Premier League players
Ukrainian Second League players
SC Tavriya Simferopol players
FC Olimpik Donetsk players
Association football defenders
Ukrainian expatriate footballers
Ukrainian expatriate sportspeople in Moldova
Expatriate footballers in Moldova
FC Tiraspol players
Naturalised citizens of Russia
Russian footballers
Crimean Premier League players
FC Sevastopol (Russia) players
FC Yevpatoriya players
FC Dynamo Saky players